Psechrus torvus is a species of spider of the genus Psechrus. It is native to India and Sri Lanka.

See also
 List of Psechridae species

References

External links
The Spider genera Psechrus and Fecenia

Psechridae
Spiders of the Indian subcontinent
Arthropods of Sri Lanka
Spiders described in 1896